John Dudley Davies (born 12 August 1927) is a former Anglican Bishop of Shrewsbury. During his tenure the post changed from suffragan bishop to area bishop with the institution of area bishops in 1992.

After service in the Royal Air Force from 1945 to 1948, Davies was educated at Trinity College, Cambridge (becoming a Cambridge Master of Arts), and at Lincoln Theological College. He was made a deacon and ordained a priest, and began his career as curate in Halton, Leeds. Following that he served for many years in Southern Africa: his posts including that of Missionary Director for Empangeni and Chaplain at the University of Witwatersrand. While he was chaplain at the University, Davies played a major role in drafting the document A Message to the People of South Africa, a pamphlet published by the South African Council of Churches that challenged the Christians in South Africa to examine the policy of Apartheid. In 1970, action by the South African government terminated his ministry in that country.

Returning to Britain in 1970 to an administrative post at the Church of England Board of Education, he then served as Vicar and University Chaplain at Keele; he was subsequently appointed Principal of Ascension College, Selly Oak, and finally (before his appointment to the episcopate) Diocesan Missioner of St Asaph. He was consecrated a bishop on 5 February 1987, by Robert Runcie, Archbishop of Canterbury, at Westminster Abbey. In 2012, while in his retirement he and his wife Shirley led the parish of St Dogfan, Llanrhaeadr-ym-Mochnant in mid-Wales (where he had previously served as Vicar), while they were without a parish priest.

On 11 February 2017, fourteen retired bishops signed an open letter to the then-serving bishops of the Church of England. In an unprecedented move, they expressed their opposition to the House of Bishops' report to General Synod on sexuality, which recommended no change to the Church's canons or practises around sexuality. By 13 February, a serving bishop (Alan Wilson, Bishop of Buckingham) and nine further retired bishops — including Davies — had added their signatures; on 15 February, the report was rejected by synod.

Davies’ books include: 
Beginning now - a Christian exploration of the first three chapters of Genesis - Fortress Press (Philadelphia) (1971)
Good news in Galatians - Paul's letter to the Galatians in Today's English version - Collins Fontana Books (Glasgow) (1975)
Creed and Conflict - Lutterworth Pr –  (1979)
The Faith Abroad - Blackwell (Oxford) (1983)
The Crisis of the Cross - the Challenge at the heart of the Christian Story - Canterbury Press (Norwich)  (1997)
Be Born in us today - The Message of the Incarnation - Canterbury Press (Norwich) (1999)
God at Work - Creation Then and Now - Canterbury Press (Norwich) (2000)
Only Say the Word - Interactive studies on healing and salvation - Canterbury Press (Norwich) (2002)
A Song for every morning - Dedication and Defiance with St Patrick's Breastplate - Canterbury Press (Norwich) (2008)
Three Mountains to Freedom - Practice Interpretation of Paul's Letter to the Galatians (Deo Publishing Blandford Forum) ( 2015)

References

 

1927 births
Alumni of Trinity College, Cambridge
20th-century Church of England bishops
Living people
Anglican bishops of Shrewsbury
Alumni of Lincoln Theological College